Synodontis punctulatus is a species of upside-down catfish native to Ethiopia, Somalia and Tanzania where it is found in the Pangani and Shebelle Rivers.  This species grows to a length of  TL.

Sources

External links 

punctulatus
Freshwater fish of Africa
Endemic fauna of Tanzania
Fish of Tanzania
Fish described in 1889
Taxa named by Albert Günther
Taxonomy articles created by Polbot